The HP 660LX (F1270A) is a handheld, palmtop organizer that runs Windows CE 2.0 or 2.11, with hardware very similar to the previous model, the HP 620lx.  It has a CompactFlash type I card slot, a PC card slot, a serial link cable plug,  and an infrared port.

It is internet capable by attaching an add-on modem or through an ethernet or Wi-Fi card. Only type 1 PC cards are supported and special drivers for the Windows CE operating system are required.

See also
 List of HP pocket computers
 HP 300LX
 HP 320LX

References

660LX